Ross Henry Taylor (born ) is a New Zealand former rugby league footballer who represented New Zealand.

Playing career
Taylor was a Junior Kiwi in 1976.

Taylor played for the Hornby club in the Canterbury Rugby League competition and was both a Canterbury and South Island representative. He first made the New Zealand national rugby league team in 1985, touring Great Britain until he broke his arm. In 1987 he made his Test debut, playing in two matches; against Papua New Guinea and Australia.

References

1961 births
Living people
New Zealand rugby league players
New Zealand national rugby league team players
Canterbury rugby league team players
South Island rugby league team players
Hornby Panthers players
Rugby league props
Junior Kiwis players